Dimethylbutadiene, formally referred to as 2,3-dimethyl-1,3-butadiene, is an organic compound with the formula (CH3)2C4H4. It is colorless liquid which served an important role in the early history of synthetic rubber. It is now a specialty reagent.

Synthesis
Dimethylbutadiene is readily prepared by an acid catalyzed dehydration reaction of pinacol:
3 C6H14O2  →  C6H10 + 2 C6H12O + 4 H2O

The current industrial route involves dimerization of propene followed by dehydrogenation.

Applications
In 1909, Fritz Hofmann and a team working at Bayer succeeded in polymerizing dimethylbutadiene.  It was then called methyl isoprene because it has one more methyl group than isoprene.  Their polymer was the first synthetic rubber.  The polymer had a number of deficiencies relative to natural rubber.  The Bayer synthesis of dimethylbutadiene involved the dehydration of pinacol, as described above.

Reactions
Dimethylbutadiene readily undergoes Diels-Alder reactions and reacts faster than 1,3-butadiene. Its effectiveness in this reaction is attributed to the stabilization of the cis-conformation owing to the influence of the methyl groups on the C2 and C3 positions.

References

Conjugated dienes
Alkadienes